Friedrich Paul Mahlo (born 28 July 1883 in Coswig, Anhalt; died 20 August 1971 in Halle, Saxony-Anhalt) was a German mathematician.

Mahlo introduced Mahlo cardinals in 1911. He also showed that the continuum hypothesis implies the existence of a Luzin set.

Publications
 PhD dissertation

References

Further reading

20th-century German mathematicians
Set theorists
1883 births
1971 deaths